Al Brown's Tunetoppers was a band led by Al Caca, born May 22, 1934, who had success in 1960 with a dance tune "The Madison" on Amy Records. The dance calls were by Cookie Brown. Although they were successful in record sales, it had to fight off a competing version by Ray Bryant on Columbia Records who titled his, "Madison Time" with calls by Eddie Morrison. As a result, Al Brown's version could only peak at #23 on the Billboard Charts. Dickey Doo & The Don'ts also released  version of "The Madison" on a United Artists album. Dickey Doo was fronted by Gerry Granahan who had a hit with "No Chemise Please" in 1958.

References

American pop music groups